They Don't Make Them Like They Used To (also referred to as They Don't Make 'Em...) is the nineteenth studio album by country superstar Kenny Rogers.

Overview
The album's title cut was used as the theme tune to the box office hit movie Tough Guys.

The song "You're My Love" was written by Prince under the pseudonym "Joey Coco" and features El DeBarge on backing vocals.

The album was a top 20 success on the country charts (and crossed over into the pop Billboard 200) with the single "Twenty Years Ago" peaking at #2.

Singles
Two singles came from the album. The title cut, released at the end of 1986, only made #53 in the country charts although it did well by hitting #10 on the adult contemporary charts. When RCA released "Twenty Years Ago" in 1987, however, Rogers returned to the top five at #2, matching this feat in Canada as well.

Track listing

Personnel 

 Kenny Rogers – lead vocals
 Robbie Buchanan – synthesizers (1, 3, 7, 9, 10), acoustic piano (3, 4, 7, 9), arrangements (3)
 Jay Graydon – synthesizers (1, 2, 7, 8, 10), lead guitar (1, 4), electronic drums (1, 2, 8), arrangements (1, 2, 4, 7, 8, 10), guitar solo (2, 9), drums (6), guitar lines (9)
 Randy Goodrum – synthesizers (2), electronic drums (2), arrangements (2)
 Steve Lukather – synthesizers (2), rhythm guitar (2), arrangements (2)
 Michael Omartian – synthesizers (4, 7)
 Marcus Ryle – synthesizers (4, 7)
 Michael Boddicker – synthesizers (5)
 Randy Kerber – keyboards (5, 6)
 Mike Lawler – keyboards (6)
 Michael Hanna – synthesizers (10)
 Paul Urrich – keyboards (10)
 Michael Landau – rhythm guitar (1, 4, 9), guitar (3, 7)
 Dann Huff – guitar (5)
 Billy Joe Walker Jr. – guitar (6)
 Kenny Mims – guitar (10), arrangements (10)
 Nathan East – bass (2)
 Abraham Laboriel – bass (3, 4, 6, 7, 9)
 Neil Stubenhaus – bass (5)
 Carlos Vega – drums (3, 4, 7)
 John Robinson – drums (5)
 Mike Baird – drums (9)
 Clyde Brooks – drums (10)
 Brandon Fields – alto saxophone (8)
 Bill Champlin – backing vocals (1, 7, 8, 10)
 Richard Page – backing vocals (2)
 El DeBarge – backing vocals (3)
 Tommy Funderburk – backing vocals (4)
 Thom Flora – backing vocals (6)
 Ann Marie Smith – backing vocals (6)
 Kin Vassy – backing vocals (6)
 Jason Scheff – backing vocals (7, 8)
 Tamara Champlin – backing vocals (8)
 Peter Beckett – backing vocals (9)

Production 
 Producers – Jay Graydon (Tracks 1-4 & 7-10); David Malloy (Tracks 1 & 6); Burt Bacharach and Carole Bayer Sager (Track 5); Kenny Mims (Track 10).
 Production Assistants – Valerie Hobel and Gail Pearson 
 A&R – Marge Meoli
 Engineers – Ian Eales, Jay Graydon, Kenny Mims and Tom Singers.
 Mixing on Track 6 – Brian Malouf
 Recorded at Garden Rake Studio (Sherman Oaks, CA); Conway Studios (Hollywood, CA); Can-Am Recorders (Tarzana, CA); House of Gold and The Garage (Nashville, TN).
 Mastered by Doug Sax at The Mastering Lab (Hollywood, CA).
 Art Direction and Design – John Coulter
 Photography – Bernie Boudreau
 Lettering – Michael Manoogian
 Management – Ken Kragen

Charts

References

Kenny Rogers albums
1986 albums
Albums produced by Burt Bacharach
RCA Records albums